Sergio Daniel Galarza Solíz (born August 25, 1975 in La Paz) is a Bolivian former footballer, who played as a goalkeeper. He last played for Sport Boys Warnes.

Club career
His former clubs include Real Santa Cruz, Blooming, Bolivar, Wilstermann, Oriente Petrolero and Guabirá. He played professionally from 1997 to 2014.

International career
Galarza also capped for the Bolivia national team 29 times from 2000 to 2013. He was the starting goalkeeper for Bolivia in the first two games during Copa América 2007. He represented his country in 11 FIFA World Cup qualification matches and was a non-playing squad member at the 1999 Confederations Cup.

Personal life
He is the oldest son of football manager and former goalkeeper from the 1970s, 1980s and early 1990s, Luis Esteban Galarza, who was the starting goalkeeper for Bolivia national football team during Copa America 1989.

References

External links
 
 
 
 

1975 births
Living people
Footballers from La Paz
Bolivian footballers
Bolivia international footballers
Association football goalkeepers
Club Blooming players
Club Bolívar players
C.D. Jorge Wilstermann players
Oriente Petrolero players
Guabirá players
1999 FIFA Confederations Cup players
1999 Copa América players
2004 Copa América players
2007 Copa América players
2011 Copa América players